Gjin Bua Shpata (sometimes anglicized as John Spata) ( 1358 – 29 October 1399) was an Albanian ruler in Western Greece with the title of Despot. Together with Peter Losha, he led raids into Epirus, Acarnania and Aetolia in 1358. He was recognized as Despot by the titular Eastern Roman Emperor in the early 1360s and ruled Aetolia (1360s–?), Angelokastron (?–1399), Naupactus (1378–1399), and Arta (1370s–1399).

Name

The word spata, in Albanian shpatë, pl. shpata, 'sword'. According to Orel (1998), the word was borrowed from Latin spāta. Hammond thus believes that he was called "John the Sword". Spatha being a type of Roman sword.

Life 
Karl Hopf's genealogy of the Shpata family is "altogether inaccurate"; according to it, his father was Pietro, the lord of Angelokastron and Delvina (1354) during the reign of Serbian emperor Stefan Dušan (r. 1331–55). It is known that Shpata had a brother, Sgouros Spata.

In 1358, some Albanian commanders overran Epirus, Acarnania and Aetolia, and subsequently established two principalities under their leaders, Shpata and Peter Losha.

Nikephoros II Orsini launched a campaign against the invading Albanians, and also faced with the threat of Radoslav Hlapen to the north, he negotiated with Simeon Uroš, presumably to prevent Simeon's Albanian allies from supporting the Albanians in Epirus. The negotiations were thwarted by Nikephoros' death fighting the Albanians at Acheloos (1359).

In 1360, Simeon Uroš, the titular Serbian Emperor, in an attempt to avoid conflict with the Albanians and as an acknowledgment of their military strength decided to the leave the areas of Arta and Aetolia to Shpata and Losha.

The Despot of Ioannina, Thomas Preljubović, had betrothed his daughter to Losha's son in 1370, satisfying the Albanians and ending the conflict between them. In 1374, however, Peter Losha died of the plague in Arta, after which Shpata took the city. At this time he was not bound by agreement to Thomas, and so he laid siege to Ioannina and ravaged the countryside by defeating the forces of Preljubovic. Thomas brought peace when he betrothed his sister Helena to Shpata the following year. Attacks on Ioannina continued, however, by the Malakasioi, who didn't succeed 
to take Ioannina in 1377 and 1379.This tribe acted independently and nor under the order of Shpata.

In 1376 or 1377, Shpata conquered Nafpaktos; by this time he controlled Arta and much of southern Epirus and Acarnania. The Achaean Knights Hospitallers of Juan Fernández de Heredia began their invasion of Epirus, moving onto Shpata, capturing Nafpaktos, and then Vonitsa in Acarnania (April 1378). However, Shpata managed to defeat and capture Heredia as a hostage, ending their campaign; he was again master of Nafpaktos by 1380. In May 1379, Shpata again devastated the countryside of Ioannina.

In 1380, Thomas made an offensive with the help of Turks reaching up to the upper Kalamas River, where however, the Albanians, in particular the tribe of Mazaraki held their defensive position and defeated again Thomas.

In 1384 Thomas Preljubović was killed by some of his bodyguards. John attacked Ioannina, but was unsuccessful in cracking the defense set up by Esau de' Buondelmonti. The two made peace, but soon returned to conflict. In 1386, Esau gained Ottoman military help. The Ottomans were, after the Battle of Kosovo (1389), unable to assist Esau, thus, the Albanians seized the opportunity and raided the environs of Ioannina in the summer by defeating Esau and forcing him to stay inside the city. The Malakasioi then raided into the territory, after which they concluded alliance with Shpata. Esau then allied himself with the caesar of Thessaly (either Alexios Angelos or Manuel), who defeated the Albanians, presumablythe Malakasioi, later that year, but not Shpata.

In January 1396, Esau married Shpata's only daughter, Irene. The marriage was part of a deal which the archons of Ioannina enforced on Esau in order to make peace with the Albanians.

Shpata died on 29 October 1399, under the continuous pressure of Tocco. Shpata's son would become the next despot of Arta and Angelokastron for the next decade.

Legacy
The Albanian academic Gjergji Shuka distinguished the origin of some South Slavic (Jovan i divski starešina, Marko Kraljević i Đemo Brđanin, Jana i Detelin voyvoda) Albanian and legends and epic songs, such as Zuku Bajraktar, Dedalia dhe Katallani, Çika e plakut Emin agë vret në duel Baloze Delinë, and in the poem regarding Shpata and the battle of Arta in 1378. The two enemies of John, Juan Fernández de Heredia and queen Joanna I of Naples, are remembered in Balkan collective memory.

Possessions

 
Aetolia (Early 1360s–?)
Angelokastron (?–1399)
Acheloos (?–1399)
Nafpaktos or "Lepanto" (1377–78; 1380–?)
Arta (1375–99)

Family

His genealogical tree is not well documented. It was first outlined by Karl Hopf in his Chroniques Greco-Romanes (p. 531) and by K. Sathas in the 19th century but a newer study finds that those works have many mistakes and gaps. Hopf's genealogy of the Shpata family is "altogether inaccurate".

G. Schiró studied the genealogy of Shpata based on the original sources, i.e. the "Chronicle of Ioannina" and the "Chronicle of Tocco", but also on the Venetian archives. He proposed that Pietro Bua had not only three sons but four and that John had only daughters. His daughter Irene married three times. He believes that the family was extinct with the death of Yaqub in 1416. Other people, mainly condottieri, with the name "Bua" are not blood relatives of this family but this name was used by many as first name since it became famous. 

He was married to a woman who is unknown in historical record. He had an only daughter, Irene who was married (before April 1381 ) to a Marchesano of Naples, Morean baron, baillie of Achaea and Esau de' Buondelmonti in 1396. Esau was the Despot of Ioannina.

Among his grandchildren were brothers Maurice Spata and Yaqub Spata, claimed to have been sons of Eirene.

See also
 Albanian principalities
 History of Albania

References

Sources

14th-century births
1399 deaths
14th-century rulers in Europe
14th-century Albanian people
Medieval Albanian nobility
Despots of Arta
Despots of the Serbian Empire
John
History of Aetolia-Acarnania